The Golden Gallows is a 1922 American silent drama film directed by Paul Scardon and starring Miss DuPont. It was produced and distributed by the Universal Film Manufacturing Company. It is not known whether the film currently survives.

Plot
As described in a film magazine, actress Willow Winters (DuPont) rises to fame when opportunity comes by accident to her. She is courted by two men, notorious man-about-town Leander Sills (Stevens) and Peter Galliner (Mower), the son of an aristocratic family. Sills is shot by a former sweetheart and his will lists Willow as his beneficiary. This action is misconstrued by Peter who renounces her, believing that sinister relations had prompted Leander's action. Sill's attorney has a letter that reveals the truth of the situation, but he withholds it in an endeavor to win the affections of Willow. During Peter's absence, Willow cultivates the acquaintance of his mother (Hancock) and wins her favor. During a reception at the Galliner home, Willow learns of the letter held by the attorney, and promises to come to the attorney's office for it. Peter returns and goes to the attorney's office where he finds Willow holding the attorney at bay with a revolver. The letter reveals the true feelings existing between Leander and Willow and Peter is convinced of her innocence.

Cast
Miss DuPont as Willow Winters
Edwin Stevens as Leander Sills
Eve Southern as Cleo Twayne
Jack Mower as Peter Galliner
George B. Williams as Mark Buckheim
Douglas Gerrard as Alexander Riche
Elinor Hancock as Mrs. Galliner
Barbara Tennant as Flo

References

External links

Lantern slide
Lobby poster

1922 films
Films directed by Paul Scardon
American silent feature films
1922 drama films
Silent American drama films
American black-and-white films
1920s American films